Shandong (alternately romanized as Shantung) is a coastal province of the People's Republic of China and is part of the East China region.

Shandong has played a major role in Chinese history since the beginning of Chinese civilization along the lower reaches of the Yellow River. It has served as a pivotal cultural and religious center for Taoism, Chinese Buddhism and Confucianism. Shandong's Mount Tai is the most revered mountain of Taoism and a site with one of the longest histories of continuous religious worship in the world. The Buddhist temples in the mountains to the south of the provincial capital of Jinan were once among the foremost Buddhist sites in China. The city of Qufu is the birthplace of Confucius and was later established as the center of Confucianism. Confucianism developed from what was later called the Hundred Schools of Thought from the teachings of the Chinese philosopher Confucius.

Shandong's location at the intersection of ancient and modern north–south and east–west trading routes has helped establish it as an economic center. After a period of political instability and economic hardship that began in the late 19th century, Shandong has experienced rapid growth in recent decades. Home to over 100 million inhabitants, Shandong is the world's sixth-most populous subnational entity, and China's second most populous province. The economy of Shandong is China's third largest provincial economy with a GDP of CNY¥8.3 trillion in 2021 or USD$1.3 trillion, which is equivalent to the GDP of Mexico. Compared to a country, it would be the 15th-largest economy and the 15th most populous as of 2021. Its GDP per capita is around the national average.

Shandong is considered one of China's leading provinces in education and research. It hosts 153 higher education institutions, ranking second in East China after Jiangsu and fourth among all Chinese provinces/municipalities after Jiangsu, Guangdong and Henan. As of 2022, two major cities ranked in the top 70 cities in the world (Jinan 36th and Qingdao 68th) by scientific research output, as tracked by the Nature Index.

Etymology 
Individually, the two Chinese characters in the name "Shandong" means "mountain" and "east". Shandong could hence be translated literally as "east of the mountains" and refers to the province's location to the east of the Taihang Mountains. A common nickname for Shandong is Qílǔ, after the States of Qi and Lu that existed in the area during the Spring and Autumn period. Whereas the State of Qi was a major power of its era, the State of Lu played only a minor role in the politics of its time. However, Lu became renowned for being the home of Confucius, and hence its cultural influence came to eclipse that of the State of Qi. The cultural dominance of the State of Lu heritage is reflected in the official abbreviation for Shandong which is "". English speakers in the 19th century called the province Shan-tung.

Location 
The province is on the eastern edge of the North China Plain and in the lower reaches of the Yellow River (Huang He), and extends out to sea as the Shandong Peninsula. Shandong borders the Bohai Sea to the north, Hebei to the northwest, Henan to the west, Jiangsu to the south, and the Yellow Sea to the southeast; it also shares a very short border with Anhui, between Henan and Jiangsu.

History

Ancient history

With its location on the eastern edge of the North China Plain, Shandong was home to a succession of Neolithic cultures for millennia, including the Houli culture (6500–5500 BC), the Beixin culture (5300–4100 BC), the Dawenkou culture (4100–2600 BC), the Longshan culture (3000–2000 BC), and the Yueshi culture (1900–1500 BC).

The earliest dynasties (the Shang dynasty and Zhou dynasty) exerted varying degrees of control over western Shandong, while eastern Shandong was inhabited by the Dongyi peoples who were considered "barbarians." Over subsequent centuries, the Dongyi were eventually sinicized.

During the Spring and Autumn period and the Warring States period, regional states became increasingly powerful. At this time, Shandong was home to two major states: the state of Qi at Linzi and the state of Lu at Qufu. Lu is noted for being the home of Confucius. However, the state was comparatively small and eventually succumbed to the larger state of Chu from the south. The state of Qi, on the other hand, was a significant power throughout the period. Cities it ruled included Linzi, Jimo (north of modern Qingdao) and Ju.

The easternmost part of the peninsula was ruled by the Dongyi state of Lai until Qi conquered it in 567 BC.

Early Imperial history
The Qin dynasty conquered Qi and founded the first centralized Chinese state in 221 BC. The Han dynasty that followed created several commanderies supervised by two regions in what is now modern Shandong: Qingzhou in the north and Yanzhou in the south. During the division of the Three Kingdoms, Shandong belonged to the Cao Wei, which ruled over northern China.

After the Three Kingdoms period, a brief period of unity under the Western Jin dynasty gave way to invasions by nomadic peoples from the north. Northern China, including Shandong, was overrun. Over the next century or so, Shandong changed hands several times, falling to the Later Zhao, then Former Yan, then Former Qin, then Later Yan, then Southern Yan, then the Liu Song dynasty, and finally the Northern Wei dynasty, the first of the Northern dynasties during the Northern and Southern dynasties period. Shandong stayed with the Northern dynasties for the rest of this period.

In 412 AD, the Chinese Buddhist monk Faxian landed at Laoshan, on the southern edge of the Shandong peninsula, and proceeded to Qingzhou to edit and translate the scriptures he had brought back from India.

The Sui dynasty reestablished unity in 589, and the Tang dynasty (618-907) presided over the next golden age of China. For the earlier part of this period, Shandong was ruled as part of Henan Circuit, one of the circuits (a political division). Later on, China splintered into warlord factions, resulting in the Five Dynasties and Ten Kingdoms period. Shandong was part of the Five Dynasties, all based in the north.

The Song dynasty reunified China in the late tenth century. The classic novel Water Margin was based on folk tales of outlaw bands active in Shandong during the Song dynasty. In 1996, the discovery of over two hundred buried Buddhist statues at Qingzhou was hailed as a major archaeological find. The statues included early examples of painted figures and are thought to have been buried due to Emperor Huizong's repression of Buddhism (he favored Taoism).

The Song dynasty was forced to cede northern China to the Jurchen Jin dynasty in 1142. Shandong was administered by Jin as Shandong East Circuit and Shandong West Circuit – the first use of its current name.

Early modern history

The modern province of Shandong was created by the Ming dynasty, where it had a more expansive territory, including the agricultural part of Liaoning. After the Ming–Qing Transition in 1644, Shandong acquired (more or less) its current borders.

During the nineteenth century, China became increasingly exposed to Western influence, and Shandong, a coastal province under the dukedom of Xiong, was significantly affected. Qingdao was leased to Germany in 1897 and Weihai to Britain in 1898. As a result of foreign pressure from the Russian Empire, which had annexed Outer Manchuria by 1860, the Qing dynasty encouraged settlement of Shandong people to what remained of northeast China.

Shandong was one of the first places in which the Boxer Rebellion started and became one of the uprising centers. In 1899, the Qing general Yuan Shikai was appointed governor of the province to suppress the uprising. He held the post for three years.

Germany took control of China's Shandong Peninsula. In 1898, Germany had leased Jiaozhou Bay and its port of Qingdao under threat of force. Development was a high government priority. Over 200 million marks were invested in world-class harbor facilities such as berths, heavy machinery, rail yards, and a floating dry dock. Private enterprises worked across the Shandong Province, opening mines, banks, factories, and rail lines.

As a consequence of the First World War, Japan seized Germany holdings in Qingdao and Shandong. The Treaty of Versailles transferred ownership to Japan instead of restoring Chinese sovereignty over the area. Popular dissatisfaction with this outcome, referred to as the Shandong Problem, led to the vehement student protests in the May Fourth Movement. Among the reservations to the Treaty that the United States Senate Committee on Foreign Relations approved was "to give Shantung to China," the treaty with reservations was not approved. Finally, Shandong reverted to Chinese control in 1922 after the United States' mediation during the Washington Naval Conference. Weihai followed in 1930.

Shandong's return of control fell into the Warlord Era of the Republic of China. Shandong was handed over to the Zhili clique of warlords, but after the Second Zhili–Fengtian War of 1924, the northeast China-based Fengtian clique took over. In April 1925, the Fengtian clique installed the warlord Zhang Zongchang, nicknamed the "Dogmeat General," as military governor of Shandong Province. Time dubbed him China's "basest warlord." He ruled over the province until 1928 when he was ousted in the wake of the Northern Expedition. He was succeeded by Han Fuju, who was loyal to the warlord Feng Yuxiang but later switched his allegiance to the Nanjing government headed by Chiang Kai-shek. Han Fuju also ousted the warlord Liu Zhennian, nicknamed the "King of Shandong East," who ruled eastern Shandong Province, hence unifying the province under his rule.

In 1937 Japan began its invasion of China proper in the Second Sino-Japanese War, which would eventually become part of the Pacific theatre of the Second World War. Han Fuju was made Deputy Commander in Chief of the 5th War Area and put in charge of defending the lower Yellow River valley. However, he abandoned his base in Jinan when Japanese troops crossed the Yellow River. He was executed for not following orders shortly thereafter.

During the Japanese occupation, with resistance continuing in the countryside, Shandong was one of the provinces where a scorched earth policy ("Three Alls Policy": "kill all," "burn all," "loot all") was implemented by Japanese general Yasuji Okamura. This lasted until Japan's surrender in 1945, killing millions of people in Shandong and Northern China.

By 1945, communist forces already held some parts of Shandong. Over the next four years of the Chinese Civil War, they expanded their holdings, eventually driving the Kuomintang (government of the Republic of China) out of Shandong by June 1949, including the noble family of Xiong (熊) who held the governorship (previously a dukedom under the Imperial era, and an ancient viscountcy originating in Chu), to the island of Taiwan. The People's Republic of China was founded in October of the same year, thereby overthrowing the democratic Republic of China from the mainland. The Xiong (alternatively spelt 'Hsiung') family is currently in residence in the city of Taichung as of the late 1990s.

Under the new government, parts of western Shandong were initially given to the short-lived Pingyuan Province, but this did not last. Shandong also acquired the Xuzhou and Lianyungang areas from Jiangsu province, but this did not last either. For the most part, Shandong has kept the same borders that it has today.

About six million people starved to death in Shandong during Great Chinese Famine.

In recent years, Shandong, especially eastern Shandong, has enjoyed significant economic development, becoming one of the People's Republic of China's richest provinces.

Geography 

The northwestern, western, and southwestern parts of the province are all part of the vast North China Plain. The province's center is more mountainous, with Mount Tai being the most prominent. The east of the province is the hilly Shandong Peninsula extending into the sea; it separates Bohai Sea in the northwest from the Yellow Sea to the east and south.

The Yellow River passes through Shandong's western areas, entering the sea along Shandong's northern coast; in its traversal of Shandong, it flows on a levee, higher than the surrounding land, and dividing western Shandong into the Hai He watershed in the north and the Huai River watershed in the south. The Grand Canal of China enters Shandong from the northwest and leaves on the southwest. Weishan Lake is the largest lake in the province. Shandong Peninsula has a rocky coastline with cliffs, bays, and islands; the large Laizhou Bay, the southernmost of the three bays of Bohai Sea, is found to the north, between Dongying and Penglai; Jiaozhou Bay, which is much smaller, is found to the south, next to Qingdao. The Miaodao Islands extends northwards from the northern coast of the peninsula.

With Jinan serving as the province's economic and cultural center, the province's economic prowess has led to the development of modern coastal cities located at Qingdao, Weihai, and Yantai.

Climate 
Shandong has a temperate climate, lying in the transition between the humid subtropical (Cwa under the Köppen climate classification) and humid continental (Köppen Dwa) zones with four distinct seasons. Summers are hot and rainy (except for a few coastal areas), while winters are cold and dry.

Geology 
Shandong is part of the Eastern Block of the North China craton. Shandong has hence experienced extensive volcanism in the Tertiary.

Some geological formations in Shandong are rich in fossils. For example, Zhucheng in southeastern Shandong has been the site of discovering many dinosaur fossils. In 2008, about 7,600 dinosaur bones  from Tyrannosaurus, Ankylosaurus, and other genera were found, likely the largest collection ever discovered at one location.

Politics 

The Shandong Provincial People's Congress is the highest organ of state power in Shandong province and Shandong's provincial legislature. Its standing committee exercises the majority of the power of The Shandong Provincial People's Congress. The current chairman of the standing committee is Li Ganjie.

The Shandong Provincial People's Government is the State Administration in Shandong province. Its main officials are elected and appointed by The Shandong Provincial People's Congress. The provincial government reports to Shandong Provincial People's Congress and State Council of the People's Republic of China.

The current Governor of Shandong is Zhou Naixiang.

Economy 
As of 1832, Shandong was exporting fruits, vegetables, wine, drugs, and deerskin, often heading to Guangzhou to exchange clothing and fabrics. The economy of Shandong is China's third largest provincial economy with a GDP of CNY¥8.3 trillion in 2021 or USD$1.3 trillion in (nominal), which is equivalent to the GDP of Mexico. Its GDP per capita is around the national average. Compared to a country, it would be the 15th-largest economy and the 15th most populous as of 2021.

Shandong ranks first among the provinces in the production of a variety of products, including cotton, wheat, and garlic as well as precious metals such as gold and diamonds. It also has one of the biggest sapphire deposits in the world. Other important crops include sorghum and maize. Shandong has extensive petroleum deposits as well, especially in the Dongying area in the Yellow River delta, where the Shengli Oil Field (lit. Victory Oilfield) is one of the major oilfields of China. Shandong also produces bromine from underground wells and salt from seawater. It is the largest agricultural exporter in China.

Shandong is one of China's richest provinces, and its economic development focuses on large enterprises with well-known brand names. Shandong is the biggest industrial producer and one of the top manufacturing provinces in China. Shandong has also benefited from South Korean and Japanese investment and tourism, due to its geographical proximity to those countries. The richest part of the province is the Shandong Peninsula, where the city of Qingdao is home to three of the most well-known brand names of China: Tsingtao Beer, Haier and Hisense. Besides, Dongying's oil fields and petroleum industries form an important component of Shandong's economy. Despite the primacy of Shandong's energy sector, the province has also been plagued with problems of inefficiency and ranks as the largest consumer of fossil fuels in all of China.

Wine industry 

The production of wine is the second largest industry in the Shandong Province, second only to agriculture.

Most of the soil is loose, well-ventilated, and rich in minerals and organic matter that enable full development of the root systems.

Presently, there are more than 140 wineries in the region, mainly distributed in the Nanwang Grape Valley and the Yan-Peng Sightseeing Highway. The region produced more than 40% of China's grape wine production. Main varieties such as Cabernet Sauvignon, Cabernet Gernischt, Merlot, Riesling and Chardonnay are all at 20 years of age, considered to be the golden stage for these grapes. Most of them maintain an average saccharinity of above 20%.

Major producers
Changyu Pioneer Wine Co.
China Great Wall Wine Co. Ltd.

Economic and technological development zones 
Jinan High-tech Industrial Development Zone
Founded in 1991, the Jinan High-tech Industrial Development zone was one of the first of its kind approved by the State Council. Since its foundation, the Jinan High-tech Industrial Development Zone has attracted enterprises as LG, Panasonic, Volvo, and Sanyo. In 2000, it joined the world science and technology association and set up a China-Ukraine High-tech Cooperation Park. The Qilu Software Park became the sister park of Bangalore park of India.
Jinan Export Processing Zone
The export processing zone is located in the eastern suburbs of Jinan, east of the Jinan High-tech Industrial Development Zone, and to the north of the Jiwang highway. The distances to the Jiqing Highway and the Jinan Airport are  respectively.
 Qingdao Economic & Technological Development Area

In 2004 the local GDP was ¥27.51 billion, which increased by 28.9%; the total industrial output value is ¥60.6 billion, which increased by 31%. There have been 48 projects invested by companies listed among the Global Fortune 500 in the zone. With the fast development of reform and opening-up, Haier, Hisense, Aucma, Sinopec, CSIC, CNOOC, CIMC etc. are all located in the zone.
 Qingdao Free Trade Zone

The State Council established Qingdao Free Trade Zone in 1992. It is also close to Qingdao Qianwan Container Terminal. At present, more than 40 foreign-invested enterprises have moved in, and 2000 projects have been approved. It is one of the special economic areas which enjoys the most favorable investment policies on customs, foreign exchange, foreign trade, and taxation in China.
 Qingdao High-tech Industrial Zone

The State Council approved Qingdao High-Tech Industrial Development Zone in 1992. The zone is located close to Qingdao Liuting Airport and Qingdao Harbor. Encouraged industries include electronic information, biotechnology, medicine, new materials, new energy, advanced equipment manufacturing, marine science & technology, national defense technology.
 Weifang Binhai Economic & Technological Development Area (BEDA)
Established in August 1995, Weifang Binhai Economic & Technological Development Area (BEDA) is a national economic and technological development area approved by the State Council. The land can be transacted conveniently, guaranteeing the demand of any project construction and providing broad development space for the enterprises in the area. Continuously, BEDA has been accredited as National Demonstration Zone invigorating the Sea by Science and Technology, National Innovation Base for Rejuvenating Trade through Science and Technology and National Demonstration Eco-Industry Park.
Weihai Economic & Technological Development Zone
Weihai Economic and Technological Development Zone is a state-level development zone approved by the State Council on Oct 21, 1992. Its nearest port is Weihai Port, and the airport closest to the zone is Wuhai Airport.
Weihai Export Processing Zone
Weihai Export & Processing Zone (EPZ) was set up by the approval of the State Council on April 27, 2000. Weihai EPZ belongs to comprehensive export & processing zone.
Weihai Torch Hi-Tech Science Park
Weihai Torch Hi-Tech Science Park is a state-level development zone approved by the State Council in March 1991.
 Yantai Economic and Technological Development Area
Yantai Economic and Technological Development Area is one of the earliest approved state level economic development zones in China. It lies on the tip of the Shandong Peninsula facing the Huanghai Sea.
 Yantai Export Processing Zone
Yantai Export Processing Zone (YTEPZ) is one of the first 15 export processing zones approved by the State Council. After developing for several years, YTEPZ is completely constructed. Up to now, owning perfect investment environment and conditions, YTEPZ has attracted investors both from foreign countries and regions such as Japan, Korea, Singapore, Hong Kong, Taiwan, Sweden, the United States, Canada, etc., and from the domestic to invest and operate in the zone.
 Zibo National New & Hi-Tech Industrial Development Zone

Demographics 

Shandong is the second most populous province of China, after Guangdong, just slightly ahead of Henan, with a population of more than 101,527,453 at the 2020 Chinese census. Over 99% of Shandong's population is Han Chinese. Minority groups include the Hui and the Manchus. Shandong citizens are also known to have the tallest average height of any Chinese province. As of 2010, 16-18-year-old male students in Yantai measured  while female students measured .

Religion

The predominant religions in Shandong are Chinese folk religions, Taoist traditions and Chinese Buddhism. According to surveys conducted in 2007 and 2009, 25,28% of the population believes in ancestor veneration, while 1.21% of the population identifies as Christian, decreasing from 1.30% in 2004. The Christians were 1.89% of the province's population in 1949, the largest proportion in China at that time. According to a survey of the year 2010, Muslims constitute 0.55% of Shandong's population up from 0.14% in 1949.

The reports didn't give figures for other types of religion; 80.05% of the population may be either irreligious or involved in worship of nature deities, Buddhism, Confucianism, Taoism, and folk religious sects. Shandong is the province where Confucius was born in the year 551 B.C.

Confucianism: The most well-known religion and/or philosophy of Shandong is Confucianism. Each year thousands of people come to Shandong to visit and learn about Confucius' culture. According to Chinese tradition, Confucius was a thinker, political figure, educator, and founder of the Ru School of Chinese thought. His teachings, preserved in the Lunyu or Analects, form the foundation of much of subsequent Chinese speculation on the ideal man's education and comportment, how such an individual should live his life and interact with others, and the forms of society and government in which he should participate. Additionally, there are many famous books about Confucius; the most famous one is the Analects written by his students. Confucius also helped edit The Five Classics (五经). The Five Classics include The Book of Songs, History, Changes and Rites.

Famous view and arts 
 Northern Shaolin Seven Star Praying Mantis Style of Kung fu is also taught in this province. It is also said that Northern Mantis had originated here and not in the Shaolin temple in Henan Province, which is always stated in books.
 Guandi is also known for Guangong, Guanyu. He is a famous general in the book Romance of the Three Kingdoms. In Daojiao (a traditional Chinese Religion), Guangong is also one of the four Protectors.
 Temple and Cemetery of Confucius and the Kong is a very famous World Heritage Site in China, and it is also a 5A Tourist Attraction. Lying to the Temple's east, the Kong Family Mansion developed from a small family house linked to the temple into an aristocratic mansion. The male direct descendants of Confucius lived and worked.

Administrative divisions

Shandong is divided into sixteen prefecture-level divisions: all prefecture-level cities (including two sub-provincial cities).
On January 1, 2019, Laiwu was wholly annexed to Jinan:

The 16 prefecture-level cities of Shandong are subdivided into 137 county-level divisions (55 districts, 26 county-level cities, and 56 counties). Those are in turn divided into 1941 township-level divisions (1223 towns, 293 townships, two ethnic townships, and 423 subdistricts).

Urban areas

Culture 

Mandarin dialects are spoken in Shandong. Linguists classify these dialects into three broad categories: Ji Lu Mandarin spoken in the northwest (as well as in neighboring Hebei), such as the Jinan dialect; Zhongyuan Mandarin spoken in the southwest (as well as in neighboring Henan); and Jiao Liao Mandarin spoken in the Shandong Peninsula (as well as the Liaodong Peninsula across the sea), such as the Qingdao dialect. When people speak of the "Shandong dialect", it is generally the first or the second that is meant; the Jiao Liao dialects of Shandong are commonly called the "Jiaodong dialect".

Shandong cuisine is one of the eight great traditions of Chinese cuisine. It is known for its breads and fish dishes. It can be more finely divided into inland Shandong cuisine (e.g. Jinan cuisine); the seafood-centered Jiaodong cuisine in the peninsula; and Confucius's Mansion cuisine, an elaborate tradition originally intended for imperial and other important feasts.

Shandong Bangzi and Lüju are popular types of Chinese opera in Shandong; both originated from southwestern Shandong.

Transport 
The Jingjiu railway (Beijing-Kowloon) and Jinghu railway (Beijing-Shanghai) are both major arterial railways that pass through the western part of Shandong. The Jingjiu passes through Liaocheng and Heze; the Jinghu passes through Dezhou, Jinan, Tai'an, Yanzhou (the Jinghu high-speed railway will through Qufu) and Zaozhuang. The Jiaoji railway is an important railway of Shandong, linking its two largest cities of Qingdao and Jinan, with the longest history of all.

Shandong has one of the densest and highest quality expressway networks among all Chinese provinces. These National Trunk Highway System (NTHS) expressways pass through or begin in Shandong. Expressways that begin in Shandong are in bold:
 G2 Jinghu Expressway (Beijing–Shanghai)
 G3 Jingtai Expressway (Beijing–Taipei, Taiwan)
 G15 Shenhai Expressway (Shenyang, Liaoning–Haikou, Hainan)
 G18 Rongwu Expressway (Rongcheng–Wuhai, Inner Mongolia)
 G20 Qingyin Expressway (Qingdao–Yinchuan, Ningxia)
 G22 Qinglan Expressway (Qingdao–Lanzhou, Gansu)
 G25 Changshen Expressway (Changchun, Jilin–Shenzhen, Guangdong)

There are also many shorter regional expressways within Shandong.

The Shandong Peninsula, with its bays and harbours, has many important ports, including Qingdao, Yantai, Weihai, Rizhao, Dongying and Longkou. Many of these ports have historical significance and the sites of former foreign naval bases or historical battles. Ferries link the cities on the north coast of the peninsula with the Liaodong Peninsula, further north across the sea.

Important airports include Jinan Yaoqiang Airport and Qingdao Jiaodong International Airport. Other airports are Dongying Shengli Airport, Jining Qufu Airport, Linyi Shubuling Airport, Weifang Airport, Weihai Dashuibo Airport and Yantai Laishan International Airport.

As of the end of 2018, Qingdao is the only city in Shandong with a metro system, with four lines in operation. Jinan will be operating its metro system in early 2019.

Tourism 
Tourist attractions in Shandong include:
 Jinan, the capital city of Shandong since Ming dynasty, renowned for its 72 Famous Springs.
Baotu Spring, a culturally significant artesian karst spring, declared as "Number One Spring under the Heaven" by the Qianlong Emperor of the Qing dynasty.
Daming Lake, the largest lake in Jinan, whose water is from the area's springs. Marco Polo described its beauty in his works.
Thousand Buddha Mountain, renowned for its numerous Buddha images which have been carved out of the hill's rock faces or free-standing structures erect since the times of the Sui dynasty and its Xingguochan Temple.
Lingyan Temple, one of the four most famous temples in Tang dynasty, in which there is 11th century Pizhi Pagoda and the Thousand Buddha Hall which houses a Ming dynasty bronze Buddha statue as well as 40 painted clay statues of life-size luohan from the Song dynasty.
remnant of Great Wall of Qi, the oldest existing Great Wall in China, which is built in 685 BCE and stretches from Jinan to Qingdao.
 Penglai, a town on the north of the Shandong peninsula famed in Taoism.
 Qingdao (a former German port city), is a beach resort city on the south of the peninsula that has German-era heritage architecture and is also famous for its Tsingtao beer.
 Ba Da Guan, made up of eight streets named after the eight great military forts of ancient times.
 Zhan Qiao, a long strip pier stretches into the sea and was the first wharf at Qingdao.
 Laoshan, a scenic area and Daoist center to the east of Qingdao.
 Qingzhou, an ancient trading and administrative center with some famous archaeological discoveries.
 Weihai, a former British port city important in the second Sino-Japanese War has British-era heritage architecture.
 World Heritage Sites:
Temple and Cemetery of Confucius, and the Kong Family Mansion in Qufu
 Tai Shan, sacred mountain, in Tai'an
Weifang has numerous natural and historic sites, such as Shihu Garden (from the Late Ming and early Qing dynasty), Fangong Pavilion (from the Song dynasty), fossil sites (including dinosaur fossils, in Shanwang, Linqu), Mount Yi National Forest Park and Mount Qingyun. Yangjiabu has painted New Year woodcuts, which are also famous all around China.

Five-Year Clean Heating Plan 
In 2017 air pollution contributed to about 21% of deaths in China. In 2017, the Chinese government began a five-year plan to convert half of northern China to clean energy for winter heating. Haiyang city is expected to convert completely to nuclear power by 2021, reducing fossil fuel emissions by more than 60,000 tons annually.

Education

Colleges and universities 
Shandong is considered one of China's leading provinces in education and research. Shandong hosts 153 higher education institutions, ranking second in the East China region after Jiangsu and fourth among all Chinese provinces/municipalities after Jiangsu, Guangdong and Henan. As of 2022, two major cities ranked in the top 70 cities in the world (Jinan 36th and Qingdao 68th) by scientific research output, as tracked by the Nature Index.
Shandong University (Jinan)
Ocean University of China (Qingdao)
China University of Petroleum (Dongying and Qingdao)
University of Jinan (Jinan)
Shandong Normal University
Shandong Agricultural University (Tai'an)
Shandong University of Finance and Economics (Jinan)
Shandong University of Traditional Chinese Medicine (Jinan)
Harbin Institute of Technology (Weihai)
China Agricultural University (Yantai)
Harbin University of Science and Technology (Weihai)
Yantai University (Yantai)
Qufu Normal University (Qufu)
Qingdao University (Qingdao)
Shandong University of Science and Technology (Qingdao)
Shandong University of Technology (Zibo)
Liaocheng University (Liaocheng)
Linyi University (Linyi)
Qingdao Agricultural University (Qingdao)
Binzhou Medical College (Binzhou)
Jining Medical University (Jining)
Weifang Medical University (Weifang)
Weifang University (Weifang)
Shandong Institute of Business and Technology (Yantai)
Shandong Women's University (Jinan)
Qingdao Technical College (Qingdao)
Rizhao Polytechnic (Rizhao)
Zibo Vocational Institute (Zibo)
Qingdao Binhai University (Qingdao)
Shandong Foreign Languages Vocational College (Rizhao)

Sports

Events held in Shandong 
 2009 National Games of China
 2002 Table Tennis World Cup
 2004 AFC Asian Cup
 2007 A3 Champions Cup
 Sailing at the 2008 Summer Olympics and Paralympics
 2011 Sudirman Cup
 2012 Badminton Asia Championships
 2012 Asian Beach Games

Professional sports teams based in Shandong 
 Chinese Basketball Association
 Shandong Hi-Speed Kirin
Qingdao Eagles
 Chinese Super League
 Shandong Taishan
 Qingdao Hainiu
 China League One
 Qingdao Youth Island

Former professional sports teams based in Shandong 
 Qingdao Haisha
 Qingdao Sunrise
 Qingdao Hailifeng
 Qingdao Huanghai
 Yantai Yiteng F.C.
 Jining Dranix
 Shandong Tengding

See also 

Major national historical and cultural sites in Shandong
Shandong people
Shantungosaurus
Shantung Problem
East Asian snowstorms of 2009–2010
East Asian snowstorms of late 2009

Notes

References

Sources 

 China's agricultural export powerhouse faces grim year - Business - Chinadaily.com.cn
Economic profile for Shandong at HKTDC

External links 

 
  Shandong Government website
  Complete Map of the Seven Coastal Provinces from 1821-1850
 Shandong Article Encyclopædia Britannica

 
Provinces of the People's Republic of China
East China